This is a list of notable Peruvians.

Scientists

 Santiago Antúnez de Mayolo (1887-1967)
 Javier Arias Stella
 Anthony Atala
 Oswaldo Baca
 Alberto Barton
 G. E. Berrios
 Carlos Bustamante
 Ramiro Castro de la Mata
 Rubén Castillo Anchapuri
 A. Roberto Frisancho
 Juan de Dios Guevara
 Enrique Guzmán y Valle
 Rafael Larco Hoyle
 Federico Kauffmann Doig
 Javier Mariátegui
 Juan Mezzich
 Modesto Montoya
 Carlos M. Ochoa
 Piermaria Oddone
 Orlando Olcese
 Carlos Carrillo Parodi
 Pedro Paulet
 Gustavo R. Paz-Pujalt
 Mariano Felipe Paz Soldán
 Aracely Quispe Neira
 Susana Pinilla
 Gastón Pons Muzzo
 Abundio Sagástegui Alva
 Ruth Shady
 Fernando Silva Santisteban
 Julio C. Tello
 José Tola Pasquel
 Alfredo Torero
 Jose L. Torero
 Mariano Eduardo de Rivero y Ustariz
 Fabiola Leon Velarde
 Federico Villarreal
 Barton Zwiebach

Social scientists
 Jorge Aliaga Cacho
 Jorge Basadre
 José Antonio del Busto Duthurburu
 Hildebrando Castro Pozo
 Antonio Cornejo Polar
 Honorio Delgado
 Hernando de Soto
 Alejandro Deustua
 Alberto Flores Galindo
 Maria Elena Foronda Farro
 Gustavo Gutiérrez, theologian
 Mariano Iberico Rodríguez
 Víctor Li-Carrillo Chía
 Guillermo Lohmann Villena
 Manuel de Mendiburu
 Francisco Miró Quesada Cantuarias
 Antenor Orrego
 Walter Peñaloza
 Anibal Quijano
 Liliana Rojas-Suarez
 María Rostworowski
 Rubén Vargas Ugarte
 César Vásquez Bazán
 Carlos Wiesse Portocarrero
 Pedro Zulen

Physicians 
 Daniel Alcides Carrión
 Carlos Manuel Chavez
 Maria Freire
 Max González Olaechea
 Humberto Guerra Allison
 Cayetano Heredia
 Augusto Huaman Velasco
 Arturo Jiménez Borja
 Carlos Monge Medrano
 Augusto Pérez Araníbar
 Hugo Pesce
 Ernesto Pinto-Bazurco
 Laura Esther Rodriguez Dulanto
 Carlos Alberto Seguín
 Hipólito Unanue
 Hermilio Valdizán
 Carlos Vallejos Sologuren

Writers

 Martín Adán (1908–1985), poet
 Ciro Alegría (1909–1967), indigenous novelist
 Marie Arana (born 1949), Peruvian-American novelist, biographer, journalist
 José María Arguedas (1911–1969), indigenous novelist and poet
 Federico Barreto (1862–1929), poet
 Jaime Bayly (born 1965), contemporary novelist
 Michael Bentine (1922–1996), Anglo-Peruvian comedian
 Alfredo Bryce Echenique (born 1939), novelist
 Guillermo Carnero Hoke (1917-1985), writer and journalist
 Carlos Castaneda (1925–1998), literary anthropologist
 Gamaliel Churata (1897–1957), socialist essayist and journalist
 José María Eguren (1874–1942), poet
 Jorge Eduardo Eielson (1924–2006), poet
 Inca Garcilaso de la Vega (c. 1539–1616), chronicler
 Manuel González Prada (1844–1918), modernista poet
 Eduardo González Viaña (born 1941), short story writer and novelist
 Javier Heraud (1942–1963), poet and would-be guerilla
 Rodolfo Hinostroza (born 1941), influential poet, writer, novelist and essayist
 Luis Jochamowitz (born 1953), journalist and biographer
 José Carlos Mariátegui (1894–1930), socialist essayist and journalist
 Jose Luis Mejia (born 1969), poet, novelist
 Gloria Macher Peruvian Canadian writer
 Clorinda Matto de Turner (1853–1909), novelist
 Angélica Palma (1878–1935), writer, journalist and biographer
 Clemente Palma (1872–1946). writer of fantastic and horror fiction 
 Ricardo Palma (1833–1919), folklorist
 Felipe Guaman Poma de Ayala, indigenous chronicler
 Santiago Roncagliolo (born 1975), writer, scriptwriter, translator and journalist.
 Julio Ramón Ribeyro (1929–1994), short story writer
 Isabel Sabogal (born 1958), novelist, poet and translator
 Sebastián Salazar Bondy (1924–1964), essayist and poet
 José Santos Chocano (1875–1934), poet
 Manuel Scorza (1928–1983), novelist and poet
 Hernando de Soto (economist) (born 1941), economist and essayist
 Carlos Thorne Boas (born 1923), novelist, writer and lawyer
 Álvaro Torres-Calderón (1975-), poet
 Abraham Valdelomar (1888–1919)
 Blanca Varela (1926–2009), poet
 Mario Vargas Llosa (born 1936), novelist of the Latin American Boom
 Virginia Vargas (born 1945), sociologist
 Cesar Vallejo (1892–1938), influential poet, writer, journalist
Chalena Vásquez (1950–2016), ethnomusicologist and folklorist
 José Watanabe (1946–2007), poet

Artists 

 Pablo Amaringo (1938–2009)
 Mario Urteaga Alvarado (1875–1957)
 Grimanesa Amorós (b. 1962)
 Ana Teresa Barboza (b. 1981), textile artist
 Hugo Orellana Bonilla (1932–2007)
 Teófilo Castillo (1857–1922)
 Diana Quijano (b. 1968), veteran actress 
 Martín Chambi (1891–1973), photographer
 Andrea Hamilton (b. 1968), fine-art photographer
 Daniel Hernández (1856–1932)
 Nelson Medina (b. 1978)
 Carlos Enrique Polanco
 Irma Poma Canchumani (b. 1969)
 Martina Portocarrero (1949-2022)
 Jorge Vinatea Reinoso (1900–1931)
 José Sabogal (1888–1956)
 Josué Sánchez (b. 1945)
 Basilio Santa Cruz Pumacallao (1635–1710)
 Fernando de Szyszlo (b. 1925)
 Antonio Sinchi Roca Inka (17th century)
 Diego Quispe Tito (1611–1681)
 Boris Vallejo (b. 1941)
 Alberto Vargas (1896–1982)
 César Yauri Huanay (b. 1962)
 Marcos Zapata (c. 1710–1773)
 Gerardo Chavez (b. c. 1937)
 Victor Delfín (b. c. 1927)
 Elena Tejada-Herrera
 Mario Testino (b. 1954), photographer
 Tom Segura (b. 1979), Comedian

Public service

Military 

 Óscar R. Benavides, early military leader 
 Francisco Morales Bermudez, dictator, 1975–80
 Juan Velasco Alvarado, dictator, 1969-1975
Miguel Grau
José Olaya
Jorge Chávez
Alfonso Ugarte y Moscoso
Andrés Avelino Cáceres
Leoncio Prado
Emilio Cavenecia

Politics 

Javier Alva Orlandini
Antonio Arenas
Víctor Andrés Belaúnde
Luis Bedoya Reyes
José Bustamante y Rivero
Ramón Castilla
Liz Chicaje (born 1982), indigenous environmentalist
Héctor Cornejo Chávez
Nicolás de Piérola
Graciela Fernández-Baca (1933–2020), economist and politician
Alberto Fujimori, president, 1990-2000
Aída García Naranjo (born 1951), educator, singer, and politician
Alan García Pérez, president, 1985–90, 2001–06 
Juan Manuel Guillén
Víctor Raúl Haya de la Torre
Ollanta Humala Tasso, president, 2011–16
Humberto Lay
Augusto B. Leguía
José Carlos Mariátegui
Sandro Mariategui Chiappe
Vladimiro Montesinos
Luis José de Orbegoso
Jose Pardo y Barreda
Manuel Pardo y Lavalle
Javier Pérez de Cuéllar, 5th United Nations Secretary General, 1982–91
Mariano Ignacio Prado
Manuel Prado Ugarteche
Albina Ruiz
Fernando Belaunde Terry, president, 1963–68, 1980–85
Patricia Salas O'Brien, Minister of Education, 2011–13
Luis Alberto Sánchez
Luis Miguel Sánchez Cerro
María del Socorro Heysen (born 1960), economist and banker
Alejandro Toledo, president, 2001-2006
Mercedes Araoz, Vice President of Peru, 2016-2020
Pedro Pablo Kuczynski, prime minister and President, 2016–18
Martín Vizcarra, governor, vice president and President of Peru, 2018-2020
Bruno Pacheco, former secretary of the President

Revolutionaries
 Tupac Amaru II, Incan revolutionary
 Mariano Melgar
 Mateo Pumacahua

Terrorists 
 Abimael Guzmán
 Elena Iparraguirre

Ancient civilizations

Hurin dynasty
Manco Capac
Sinchi Roca
Mayta Cápac
Cápac Yupanqui

Hanan dynasty
Inca Roca, Incan emperor
Yahuar Huaca, Incan ruler
Pachacuti Inca Yupanqui
Huayna Capac, Incan ruler
Huáscar, Inca ruler, 1527–32
Atahualpa, last Incan ruler

Vilcabamba (Colonial Era) 

Manco Inca Yupanqui, de facto Incan leader
Titu Cusi Yupanqui, de facto Incan leader
Túpac Amaru, de facto Incan leader

Athletes

Boxers 
 Mauro Mina
 Orlando Romero
 Oscar Rivadeneira
 Marcelo Quiñones
 Kina Malpartida

Chess players 
 Esteban Canal
 Jorge Cori
 Deysi Cori
 Julio Granda
 Oscar Quiñones
 Guillermo Ruiz

Association football players 
 Julio Baylón
 José Luis Carranza
 Roberto Challe
 Héctor Chumpitaz
 Luis Cruzado
 Teófilo Cubillas
 César Cueto
 José del Solar
 Jefferson Farfán
 Raúl Fernández
 Teodoro "Lolo" Fernández
 Nicolás Fuentes
 Alberto Gallardo
 José Paolo Guerrero
 Pedro León
 Valeriano López
 Roberto Martínez Vera-Tudela
 Julio Meléndez
 Ramón Mifflin
 Claudio Pizarro
 Percy Rojas
 Oswaldo Ramírez
 Nolberto Solano
 Hugo Sotil
 Alberto Terry
 Juan Manuel Vargas
 Alejandro Villanueva
 Santiago Acasiete
 Jair Baylón
 Leao Butron
 Daniel Chávez
 Rinaldo Cruzado
 Juan Cominges
 Johan Fano
 Martín Hidalgo
 Hernan Rengifo
 Alberto Junior Rodríguez Valdelomar
 Carlos Zambrano

Surfers 
 Sofia Mulanovich

Tennis players 
 Laura Gildemeister
 Luis Horna
 Alejandro Olmedo
 Jaime Yzaga
 Iván Miranda
 Mauricio Echazu
 Laura Arraya
 Duilio Beretta

Volleyball players 
 Denisse Fajardo
 Rosa García
 Gina Torrealva
 Natalia Málaga
 Gabriela Pérez del Solar
 Cecilia Tait
 Leyla Chihuán

Other 
 Edgar Prado, jockey
 Jorge F. Chavez, jockey
 Kenny Florian, mixed martial arts
 Antonio Oré, Olympic basketball player
 Jorge Andres, sportscaster

Beauty queens and models
 Juana Burga Cervera
 Helena Christensen, model
 Madeleine Hartog Bell, Miss World - 1967
 Claudia Hernández, Miss Perú Mundo - 2002/2003
 María Julia Mantilla, Miss World - 2004
 Tilsa Lozano, Miss Playboy TV Latinoamerica & Iberia
 Danella Lucioni
 Natalie Vértiz, Miss Peru - 2011
 Gladys Zender, Miss Universe - 1957

Fictional characters
 Paddington Bear
 Kuzco

Religion
 Saint Rose of Lima
 Saint Martin de Porres

Other 

Gaston Acurio, chef
Lady Bardales
Analí Cabrera (1959–2011), actress, vedette, and athlete
Jorge Chavez, airplane pilot
Raúl Chávez Sarmiento, math prodigy, second youngest bronze, silver, gold medalist at the International Mathematical Olympiad
Alicia Delgado, folk singer
Virgilio Martínez Véliz, chef
Carlos I. Noriega, astronaut
Gonzalo Castro de la Mata, ecologist
Amanda Portales, singer, author, composer, and Peruvian folklore performer
Luis Miró Quesada Garland, architect
Richiardi Jr, stage magician
Pamela Rodríguez (born 1983), singer
Wenceslao Sarmiento, modernist architect
Pamela Silva Conde, Emmy award-winning journalist
Valentina Shevchenko, UFC Women's Flyweight champion

References